The Frogs (often abbreviated Ran. or Ra.) is a comedy written by the Ancient Greek playwright Aristophanes. It was performed at the Lenaia, one of the Festivals of Dionysus in Athens, in 405 BC and received first place.

Plot

The Frogs tells the story of the god Dionysus, who, despairing of the state of Athens' tragedians, travels to Hades (the underworld) to bring the playwright Euripides back from the dead. (Euripides had died the year before, in 406 BC.) He brings along his slave Xanthias, who is smarter and braver than Dionysus. As the play opens, Xanthias and Dionysus argue over what kind of jokes Xanthias can use to open the play. For the first half of the play, Dionysus routinely makes critical errors, forcing Xanthias to improvise in order to protect his master and prevent Dionysus from looking incompetent—but this only allows Dionysus to continue to make mistakes with no consequence.

To find a reliable path to Hades, Dionysus seeks advice from his half-brother Heracles, who had been there before in order to retrieve the hell hound Cerberus. Dionysus shows up at his doorstep dressed in a lion-hide and carrying a club. Heracles, upon seeing the effeminate Dionysus dressed up like himself, can't help laughing. When Dionysus asks which road is the quickest to get to Hades, Heracles tells him that he can hang himself, drink poison or jump off a tower. Dionysus opts for the longer journey, which Heracles himself had taken, across a lake (possibly Lake Acheron).

When Dionysus arrives at the lake, Charon ferries him across. Xanthias, being a slave, is not allowed in the boat, and has to walk around it, while Dionysus is made to help row the boat.

This is the point of the first choral interlude (parodos), sung by the eponymous chorus of frogs (the only scene in which frogs feature in the play). Their croaking refrain –  – greatly annoys Dionysus, who engages in a mocking debate (agon) with the frogs. When he arrives at the shore, Dionysus meets up with Xanthias, who teases him by claiming to see the frightening monster Empusa. A second chorus composed of spirits of Dionysian Mystics soon appear.

The next encounter is with Aeacus, who mistakes Dionysus for Heracles due to his attire. Still angry over Heracles' theft of Cerberus, Aeacus threatens to unleash several monsters on him in revenge. Frightened, Dionysus trades clothes with Xanthias. A maid then arrives and is happy to see Heracles. She invites him to a feast with virgin dancing girls, and Xanthias is more than happy to oblige. But Dionysus quickly wants to trade back the clothes. Dionysus, back in the Heracles lion-skin, encounters more people angry at Heracles, and so he makes Xanthias trade a third time.

When Aeacus returns to confront the alleged Heracles (i.e., Xanthias), Xanthias offers him his "slave" (Dionysus) for torturing, to obtain the truth as to whether or not he is really a thief. The terrified Dionysus tells the truth that he is a god. After each is whipped, Dionysus is brought before Aeacus' masters, and the truth is verified. The maid then catches Xanthias and chats him up, interrupted by preparations for the contest scene.

The maid describes the Euripides-Aeschylus conflict. Euripides, who had only just recently died, is challenging the great Aeschylus for the seat of "Best Tragic Poet" at the dinner table of Pluto, the ruler of the underworld. A contest is held with Dionysus as judge. The two playwrights take turns quoting verses from their plays and making fun of the other. Euripides argues the characters in his plays are better because they are more true to life and logical, whereas Aeschylus believes his idealized characters are better as they are heroic and models for virtue. Aeschylus mocks Euripides' verse as predictable and formulaic by having Euripides quote lines from many of his prologues, each time interrupting the declamation with the same phrase "" ("... lost his little flask of oil"). (The passage has given rise to the term lekythion for this type of rhythmic group in poetry.) Euripides counters by demonstrating the alleged monotony of Aeschylus' choral songs, parodying excerpts from his works and having each citation end in the same refrain  ("oh, what a stroke, won't you come to the rescue?", from Aeschylus' lost play Myrmidons). Aeschylus retorts to this by mocking Euripides' choral meters and lyric monodies with castanets.

During the contest, Dionysus redeems himself for his earlier role as the butt of every joke. He now rules the stage, adjudicating the contestants' squabbles fairly, breaking up their prolonged rants, and applying a deep understanding of Greek tragedy.

To end the debate, a balance is brought in and each are told to tell a few lines into it. Whoever's lines have the most "weight" will cause the balance to tip in their favor. Euripides produces verses of his that mention, in turn, the ship Argo, Persuasion and a mace. Aeschylus responds with the river Spercheios, Death and two crashed chariots and two dead charioteers.  Since the latter verses refer to "heavier" objects, Aeschylus wins, but Dionysus is still unable to decide whom he will revive.  He finally decides to take the poet who gives the best advice about how to save the city. Euripides gives cleverly worded but essentially meaningless answers while Aeschylus provides more practical advice, and Dionysus decides to take Aeschylus back instead of Euripides. Pluto allows Aeschylus to return to life so that Athens may be succoured in her hour of need and invites everyone to a round of farewell drinks. Before leaving, Aeschylus proclaims that Sophocles should have his chair while he is gone, not Euripides.

Critical analysis
The parodos contains a paradigmatic example of how in Greek culture obscenity could be included in celebrations related to the gods.

Politics
Kenneth Dover claims that the underlying political theme of The Frogs is essentially "old ways good, new ways bad". He points to the parabasis for proof of this:  "The antepirrhema of the parabasis (718–37) urges the citizen-body to reject the leadership of those whom it now follows, upstarts of foreign parentage (730–2), and turn back to men of known integrity who were brought up in the style of noble and wealthy families" (Dover 33). Kleophon is mentioned in the ode of the parabasis (674–85), and is both "vilified as a foreigner" (680–2) and maligned at the end of the play (1504, 1532).

The Frogs deviates from the pattern of political standpoint offered in Aristophanes' earlier works, such as The Acharnians (425 BC), Peace (421 BC), and Lysistrata (411 BC), which have all been termed 'peace' plays.  The Frogs is not often thus labeled, however – Dover points out that though Kleophon was adamantly opposed to any peace which did not come of victory, and the last lines of the play suggest Athens ought to look for a less stubborn end to the war, Aeschylus' advice (1463–5) lays out a plan to win and not a proposition of capitulation.  Also, The Frogs contains solid, serious messages which represent significant differences from general critiques of policy and idealistic thoughts of good peace terms. During the parabasis Aristophanes presents advice to give the rights of citizens back to people who had participated in the oligarchic revolution in 411 BC, arguing they were misled by Phrynichus' 'tricks' (literally 'wrestlings'). Phrynichus was a leader of the oligarchic revolution who was assassinated, to general satisfaction, in 411.  This proposal was simple enough to be instated by a single act of the assembly, and was actually put into effect by Patrokleides' decree after the loss of the fleet at Aegospotami. The anonymous Life states that this advice was the basis of Aristophanes' receipt of the olive wreath, and the author of the ancient Hypothesis says admiration of the parabasis was the major factor that led to the play's second production.

J.T. Sheppard contends that the exiled general Alcibiades is a main focus of The Frogs. At the time the play was written and produced, Athens was in dire straits in the war with the Peloponnesian League, and the people, Sheppard claims, would logically have Alcibiades on their minds. Sheppard quotes a segment of text from near the beginning of the parabasis:

He states that though this text ostensibly refers to citizens dispossessed of their rights, it will actually evoke memories of Alcibiades, the Athenians' exiled hero.  Further support includes the presentation of the chorus, who recites these lines, as initiates of the mysteries. This, Sheppard says, will also prompt recollection of Alcibiades, whose initial exile was largely based on impiety regarding these religious institutions. Continuing this thought, the audience is provoked into remembering Alcibiades' return in 408 BC, when he made his peace with the goddesses. The reason Aristophanes hints so subtly at these points, according to Sheppard, is because Alcibiades still had many rivals in Athens, such as Kleophon and Adeimantus, who are both blasted in the play.  Sheppard also cites Aeschylus during the prologue debate, when the poet quotes from The Oresteia:

This choice of excerpt again relates to Alcibiades, still stirring his memory in the audience.  Sheppard concludes by referencing the direct mention of Alcibiades' name, which occurs in the course of Dionysus' final test of the poets, seeking advice about Alcibiades himself and a strategy for victory.  Though Euripides first blasts Alcibiades, Aeschylus responds with the advice to bring him back, bringing the subtle allusions to a clearly stated head and concluding Aristophanes' point.

Structure
According to Kenneth Dover, the structure of The Frogs is as follows: In the first section Dionysus' has the goal of gaining admission to Pluto's palace, and he does so by line 673. The parabasis follows, (lines 674–737) and in the dialogue between the slaves a power struggle between Euripides and Aeschylus is revealed. Euripides is jealous of the other's place as the greatest tragic poet. Dionysus is asked by Pluto to mediate the contest or agon.

Charles Paul Segal argues that The Frogs is unique in its structure, because it combines two forms of comic motifs, a journey motif and a contest or agon motif, with each motif being given equal weight in the play.

Segal contends that Aristophanes transformed the Greek comedy structure when he downgraded the contest or agon which usually preceded the parabasis and expanded the parabasis into the agon. In Aristophanes' earlier plays, i.e., The Acharnians and The Birds, the protagonist is victorious prior to the parabasis and after the parabasis is usually shown implementing his reforms. Segal suggests that this deviation gave a tone of seriousness to the play. For more detail see Old Comedy.

Sophocles
Sophocles was a very influential and highly admired Athenian playwright who died after the play had already been written, during the first phase of its production. Aristophanes did not have enough time to rewrite the play with Sophocles in it, so he simply added in scattered references to Sophocles's recent death, referring to him as a worthy playwright. When Aeschylus leaves the underworld at the end of the play, Sophocles takes his throne. The decision to put Sophocles in the same camp as Aeschylus makes sense, in light of the fact that Sophocles' tragic style was reminiscent of Aeschylus', whereas Euripides represents a new style altogether. This is consistent with the central theme of contrasting old ways and new ways.

References to the play

In the Gilbert and Sullivan light opera The Pirates of Penzance, Major-General Stanley, in his introductory song, includes the fact that he "knows the croaking chorus from The Frogs of Aristophanes" in a list of all his scholarly achievements.

Stephen Sondheim and Burt Shevelove freely adapted The Frogs to a 1974 musical of the same name, replacing the Greek playwright characters with George Bernard Shaw and William Shakespeare.

Hope Mirrlees's Paris: A Poem (1920) cites the chorus in the opening of her modernist poem: "Brekekekek coax coax we are passing under the Seine" (line 10), which also performs the sound of the metro train.

Finnegans Wake references this play with the words "Brékkek Kékkek Kékkek Kékkek! Kóax Kóax Kóax! Ualu Ualu Ualu! Quaouauh!"

The call of the Frog Chorus, "Brekekekéx-koáx-koáx" (Greek: Βρεκεκεκέξ κοάξ κοάξ), followed by a few of Charon's lines from the play, formed part of the Yale "Long Cheer", which was first used in public in 1884, and was a feature of Yale sporting events from that time until the 1960s. Lake Forest Academy's teams are known as the "Caxys", a name derived from a similar cheer.

The Long Cheer was echoed in Yale graduate Cole Porter's song "I, Jupiter" in his musical Out of This World, in which Jupiter sings "I, Jupiter Rex, am positively teeming with sex," and is answered by the chorus "Brek-ek-ko-ex-ko-ex-SEX! Brek-ek-ko-ex-ko-ex-SEX!" Other colleges imitated or parodied the long cheer, including Penn, which adopted the cry, "Brackey Corax Corix, Roree". One of these parodies was the first Stanford Axe yell in 1899, when yell leaders used it during the decapitation of a straw effigy: "Give 'em the axe, the axe, the axe!" The Frog Chorus also figured in a later Axe Yell rendering the last two segments "croax croax", which was used by the University of California and Stanford University.

In his book Jesting Pilate, author Aldous Huxley describes listening to a performance of a poem on the subject of Sicily by the Panjabi poet Iqbal, recited by a Mohammedan of Arab descent at a party in Bombay. Huxley summarized the performance with the statement: "And in the suspended notes, in the shakes and warblings over a single long-drawn syllable, I seemed to recognize that distinguishing feature of the Euripidean chorus which Aristophanes derides and parodies in the Frogs".

Translations
 Gilbert Murray, 1902, rhyming verse, full text
 Matthew Dillon, 1995, full text
 George Theodoridis, 2008, prose, full text
 Ian C. Johnston, verse, full text
 R. H. Webb, available for digital loan

References

Further reading
 The Frogs in Greek (from Perseus Project)

External links
 
 
 
 

Dionysus
Frogs in art
Katabasis
Plays about slavery
Plays based on classical mythology
Plays by Aristophanes
Plays set in ancient Greece
Underworld in classical literature